Elections to Sheffield City Council were held on 5 May 1995. One third of the council was up for election.

Election result

|- style="background-color:#F9F9F9"
! style="background-color: " |
| Militant Labour
| align="right" | 0
| align="right" | 0
| align="right" | 0
| align="right" | 0
| align="right" | 0.0
| align="right" | 0.6
| align="right" | 794
| align="right" | +0.2
|-

|- style="background-color:#F9F9F9"
! style="background-color: " |
| International Communist
| align="right" | 0
| align="right" | 0
| align="right" | 0
| align="right" | 0
| align="right" | 0.0
| align="right" | 0.0
| align="right" | 37
| align="right" | New
|-

This result had the following consequences for the total number of seats on the council after the elections:

Wards

Elsie Smith was a sitting councillor for Darnall ward

The Liberal Democrats had gained the Brightside seat in a by-election

Stephen Jones was a sitting councillor for Nether Shire ward
James Jamison was previously elected as a Labour councillor

|- style="background-color:#F9F9F9"
! style="background-color: " |
| International Communist
| Christopher Marsden
| align="right" | 37
| align="right" | 1.5
| align="right" | +1.5
|-

Patricia Midgley was a sitting councillor for Nether Edge ward

|- style="background-color:#F9F9F9"
! style="background-color: " |
| Militant Labour
| Steven Tice
| align="right" | 200
| align="right" | 8.2
| align="right" | +8.2
|-

|- style="background-color:#F9F9F9"
! style="background-color: " |
| Militant Labour
| Kenneth Douglas
| align="right" | 594
| align="right" | 21.5
| align="right" | +0.9
|-

The Liberal Democrats had gained the Walkley seat in a by-election

References

1995 English local elections
1995
1990s in Sheffield